Billy McLaughlin is an American new age acoustic guitarist, composer and producer.

Background
McLaughlin, of Irish ancestry, graduated with honors from the University of Southern California. He is one of nine children. McLaughlin now resides in his home state of Minnesota where he is raising his two boys. 

In 1998, Mclaughlin began noticing symptoms of focal dystonia, a neurological condition which severely limits his ability to play guitar. He began retraining himself to play left-handed, ultimately developing a tapping style holding the neck of the guitar toward his right shoulder. A documentary entitled Changing Keys was made about this phase of his career.  

He returned to performing publicly in 2006, both solo and with his band.  During his December 2006 concerts with Simple Gifts, the sextet he formed in 2002 to play Christmas music, he performed the hammering style left-handed and more traditional strumming style right-handed, using separate sets of guitars tuned for the manner in which he was playing. McLaughlin released a new live album, entitled Into the Light, in early 2007.

McLaughlin is a voluntary ambassador for the Dystonia Medical Research Foundation.

Performance
McLaughlin has toured around the United States since before 1988, and also performs in Japan and across Europe.

The National Association for Campus Activities has awarded McLaughlin with three National Campus Entertainer of the Year Awards (Jazz) and a Hall of Fame Achievement Award.

Discography
Billy McLaughlin (1988) Proton Music Publishing
Inhale Pink (1989) Proton Discs
The Archery of Guitar (1993) Proton Discs
Wintersongs & Traditionals (1994) Proton Discs
Stormseeker – The Best of Billy McLaughlin (1995) Proton Discs
Fingerdance (1996) Narada
Out of Hand (1999) Narada
Acoustic Original: The Best of Billy McLaughlin (2001)  Narada
Guitar Meditations – with Soulfood (2001) Soulfood Music
A Simple Gift (2002) Proton Discs (Debut release of Simple Gifts)
Guitar Meditations II – with Soulfood (2005) Soulfood Music
Into the Light (2007) Proton Discs
Shepherds & Angels – with Simple Gifts (2007) Proton Discs
A Small Town Christmas – with Simple Gifts (2009) Proton Discs
The Star Carol – with Simple Gifts (2010) Proton Discs
"Winter grace - with Simple Gifts" (2013) Proton Discs 
"This Christmastide - with Simple Gifts" (2016) Proton Discs

With The Billy McLaughlin Group
Exhale Blue (1989)
The Bow and the Arrow (1995)
Finally! – Live (2002) Proton Discs

Compilation appearances
Stories (Narada Artist Collection)
The Next Generation - Narada Sampler
Narada Film and Television Music Sampler

Accolades 
McLaughlin received the 2010 Public Leadership in Neurology Award from the American Academy of Neurology.

See also 
List of ambient music artists

References

American acoustic guitarists
American male guitarists
Fingerstyle guitarists
American male composers
21st-century American composers
Record producers from Minnesota
University of Southern California alumni
Living people
Year of birth missing (living people)
Narada Productions artists
21st-century American male musicians
Musicians with dystonia